USS Fairfield (AK-178) was an  acquired by the U.S. Navy during the final months of World War II. She served in the Pacific Ocean theatre of operations and was decommissioned shortly after war’s end.

Construction
The second ship to be so named by the Navy, Fairfield  was launched on 6 February 1945, by Kaiser Cargo Inc., Richmond, California, under a Maritime Commission contract, MC hull 2374; sponsored by Mrs. Henry W. Creeger; acquired by the Navy on a loan-charter basis; and commissioned on 28 March 1945.

Service history

World War II-related service
Fairfield completed shakedown and fitting out before 8 May, when she arrived at San Francisco, California, to load cargo for Manus, Samar and Calicoan Islands. In early July she loaded US Army cargo at Parang, Mindanao, and was en route to Agusan province when on the 14th she picked up six Filipino guerillas from the wreckage of their boat which had been cut in two and sunk by a submarine.

Fairfield continued her cargo operations among the islands of the southwest Pacific Ocean through October 1945 when she was drydocked at Newcastle, Australia, for a brief period before being assigned to carry Australian Army cargo from Sydney, Australia, to Borneo, Tacloban, and Manila, Philippines.

Post-war decommissioning
During December the Navy removed all excess gear and she steamed into Yokosuka, Japan, on the 25th. On 8 January 1946 a Japanese crew came on board for training and on the 11th she was decommissioned and turned over to the War Shipping Administration for disposal.

US Army service
Fairfield was transferred to the US Army on 5 February 1946, and wrecked on 18 December 1946.

Notes 

Citations

Bibliography 

Online resources

External links
 

 

Alamosa-class cargo ships
Fairfield County, Connecticut
Fairfield County, Ohio
Fairfield County, South Carolina
Ships built in Richmond, California
1945 ships
World War II auxiliary ships of the United States